The Battle of Eckernförde was a Danish naval assault on Schleswig. The Danes  were defeated and two of their ships were lost with the surviving crew being detained.

Background  
When the fighting resumed after the armistice in 1849, the Danes attacked Sundeved and Schleswig. To support the offensive, the Danish Navy would carry out a diversionary attack on the town of Eckernförde and destroy the German coastal batteries there. A smaller force of 250 troops would also be put ashore to give the impression of a larger landing force. The German flanks were vulnerable to landings along the coasts of Schleswig and such a company could not be ignored by the Germans. Commander Frederik August Paludan was appointed commander of the operation.

The Danish Squadron 
The Danish force assigned to the attack consisted of:
Liner Christian VIII (84 guns) – Frederik Paludan
Frigate  (48 guns) – J. A. Meyer
The steamships Hekla and Geiser – Christian Krieger

German fortress defense 
Eckernförde was defended by two coastal batteries with the following equipment:
2x 84-pound bomb cannons
4x 18-pound cannons
The crew consisted of 91 artillerymen from the Schleswig-Holstein 5th Fortress Artillery Regiment.

Battle 
At 07:30 on the morning of April 5, the Danish squadron sailed into Eckernfördeviken. The bombing of the German batteries began immediately and the northern fortress was soon put out. Suddenly,  the wind increased in strength and drove frigate Gefion away from its place in the Danish battle line. When Geiser tried to tow the frigate back, the steamer was subjected to murderous firing from the remaining battery. A hit knocked out Geiser'''s steam engine and left the ship unmaneuverable.

Soon, Christian VIII also came out of position, and when Hekla tried to save the liner, she was also seriously damaged by the concentrated attack by the Germans. The strong wind prevented the sailing ships from getting out of the bay and Paludan asked for a ceasefire.
During the ceasefire, the Danes made an unsuccessful attempt to move their ships to safety. The fighting resumed at 17:30 and Gefion was soon forced to fly the white flag. Despite the violent bombardment, the crew of Christian VIII continued to resist. Paludan, however, soon realized that continued combat was pointless and ordered the ship to be abandoned.

During the evacuation, a fire broke out on board and firefighting attempts by the crew failed. A German non-commissioned officer boarded and demanded that the wounded crew members remain on the ship and that its gunpowder stock not be emptied. Paludan protested with reference to the fire on board, but was eventually forced to agree to the Germans' demands to surrender. Despite this, he still ordered that the gunpowder be thrown overboard. However, the order came late as the fire spread across the ship at a rapid pace. At 20:00, Christian VIII exploded. Most of those on board, including many wounded, died immediately from the explosion. Paludan watched the shipwreck from ashore.

 Aftermath  
The attack cost the Danes dearly. Two ships had been lost and over 1,100 sailors had either been killed, wounded or captured, including the Danish naval officer Christian Krieger, who commanded the steamship Geiser and died after the gunpowder exploded underneath the deck. The Schleswig-Holstein losses were lighter with only 4 dead and 14 wounded.

In Fiction
The battle makes an appearance early in the novel We, the Drowned by Danish author Carsten Jensen.

References

Bibliography
 Johs Nielsen, Treårskrigen 1848–1851 1993 
 Hans Christian Bjerg og Ole L. Frantzen, Danmark i krig'' 2005

External links
 
 Katastrofen ved Eckernførde
 Slaget i Egernførde Fjord 

Eckernförde
Conflicts in 1849
1849 in Denmark
1849 in Germany
Eckernförde
Eckernförde
April 1849 events